Pullipulikalum Aattinkuttiyum ( Leopards and a Lamb) is a 2013 Malayalam-language Action comedy film directed by Lal Jose. It has Kunchacko Boban, Namitha Pramod in lead roles. Pullippulikalum Aattinkuttiyum, scripted by M Sindhuraj, was produced under the banner of Balcony 6 Entertainments. The cinematographer is S. Kumar and the music director is Vidyasagar.  The film tackles social issues in Kuttanad, through the tale of a hapless youth. Pullipulikalum Aattinkuttiyum is regarded as the best comedy entertainer of 2013. It was a Super Hit at the box office.

Plot 
Chakka Gopan is a talented businessman and tourist guide residing in Kuttanad, who don't have a satisfying life. He is the sole breadwinner of his family, which consists of his mother Madhavi and three elder brothers. His brothers, Maniyan, Suku and Vijayan are good for nothing. They spend their day drinking and do small jobs like threatening people for a living. They have many enemies, who take revenge on the helpless Gopan instead. Gopan has a rival in Kuttanad, Kavalaykal Kuriyachan, a famous boat travel agency owner in Kuttanad.

One day, Gopan manages to get some tourists. But he has to provide them some entertainment. He approaches Mamachan, a friend who does multiple jobs like a travel agency and marriage brokering. Mamachan's attitude of doing everything earned him the name 'Enthinum Eathinum Mamachan' (Anything and Everything Mamachan). Mamachan arranges a dancer, Kainakary Jayasree for Gopan's guests. Jayasree's mother Revamma, a former drama actress, is a bit dubious of Gopan and tries to increase their payment day by day. She even fakes an illness with Jayasree for the money.

During one such dance, the police come searching for a missing girl. Gopan tells them to search in Kuriyachan's boat and in the end Kuriyachan is arrested for immoral trafficking.

Gopan begins to panic, as he thinks Kuriyachan's men will come for revenge. After some comic events involving Kuriyachan, Gopan is beaten by Kuriyachan's men while returning Jayasree. After Gopan gets okay, he falls for Jayasree and vice versa. But they get trapped in a fake human trafficking case. They however come out unscathed, after Gopan's brothers and friends threaten the policeman with evidence of bribes and his affairs with other women.

Sometime later, Gopan's brother Maniyan suddenly has a chest pain and is taken to the hospital. The doctor informs Gopan that the pain was only gas. But Gopan convinces the doctor to tell his brother's that it was a heart attack, sensing an opportunity to change his brothers' way of living. The doctor convinces Maniyan, Suku and Vijayan that they could also have a heart attack if they don't change their habits. The fear of death has the brothers changing their habits and becoming hardworking men. They enter the boat racing team with Maniyan being the team captain. The brothers are also married to their subsequent crushes.

Meanwhile, Revamma, who was against Gopan and Jayasree's relation, tries many tricks to separate them but is forced to give up.

But Kuriyachan's vengeance increases as he was sacked from team captain spot and replaced by Maniyan. He wrecks the race boat and destroys Gopan's expensive house boat, which is the only savings of Gopan's family. He also cheats Revamma, who was trying to sell her home. As a result, Revamma has a heart attack and dies. Not wanting to bring his brothers back to their old rowdy life, Gopan and his comrades Mamachan, Susheelan and Babu go to exact revenge. They bash up Kuriyachan and then leaves him to be beat up by the remaining townspeople.

In the final scene, Gopan and Jayasree are shown on a boat, planning for the life ahead.

Cast

 Kunchacko Boban as Chakkattutharayil Gopan/ Chakka Gopan / Aadu Gopan, Jayasree's love interest turned husband
 Namitha Pramod as Kainakary Jayasree/Jayasree Gopan. Gopan's love interest turned wife
Shammi Thilakan as Kavalakkal kuriyachan
 Irshad as Chakkattutharayil Maniyan (Chakka Maniyan), Gopan's eldest brother
 Joju George as Chakkattutharayil Suku (Chakka Suku), Gopan's older brother
 Shiju as Chakkattutharayil Vijayan (Chakka Vijayan), Gopan's older brother
 Suraj Venjaramoodu as Mamachan (broker)
 Anusree as Kochurani
 Harisree Asokan as Susheelan
 Bindu Panicker as Kainakary Revamma, Jayasree's mother
 K. P. A. C. Lalitha as Chakkattutharayil Madhavi, Maniyan, Vijayan, Suku, Gopan mother
 Thesni Khan as Jalaja
 Anjana Appukuttan as Ramani
 Dinesh Nair as Adv. Ashokan Kuppapuram
 Shivaji Guruvayoor as Francis, sexton
 Ponnamma Babu as Soshamma, sexton's Wife.
 Reena Basheer as Lizy
 Seema G. Nair as Vimala
 Subeesh as Babu
 Chali Pala as S.I. George
 Sreenivasan as Narrator (Voice Only)
 Sunil Babu as Joker Jose

Soundtrack
Two trailers and two songs from the film, "Cheru Cheru" & "Otta Thumbi" from the film were released online. "Koottimuttiya" was also released on YouTube in a video that features Kunchacko Boban and Namitha Pramod.

Box office
The film had a high opening at the Kerala box office. The film collected ₹6 crore from 21 days in Kerala box office. This film was commercial success and ran over 100 days in theatres and grossed a total of ₹14 crore from the box office.

References

External links
Official Facebook Page
 

2013 films
2010s Malayalam-language films
2013 romantic comedy films
Indian romantic comedy films
Films shot in Alappuzha
Films scored by Vidyasagar
Films directed by Lal Jose